Keith Towbridge (born May 21, 1995) is a former American football tight end. He played college football for Louisville, and in the National Football League for the Buffalo Bills, Tennessee Titans, and Washington Redskins.

College career
A 3-star recruit, Towbridge accepted an offer to play college football at Louisville, over offers from Bowling Green,  Cincinnati, Illinois, Kentucky, Nebraska, Purdue, and Toledo. In his college career, spanning from 2012 through 2016, Towbridge recorded 21 receptions for 283 yards and 3 touchdowns.

Professional career

Buffalo Bills
Towbridge signed with the Buffalo Bills as an undrafted free agent on May 5, 2017. He was waived/injured on August 7, 2017 and was placed on injured reserve.

On September 1, 2018, Towbridge was waived by the Bills. He was re-signed to the practice squad on October 9, 2018.

Atlanta Legends (AAF)
In 2019, Towbridge joined the Atlanta Legends of the Alliance of American Football.

Tennessee Titans
After the AAF suspended football operations, Towbridge signed with the Tennessee Titans on April 8, 2019. On June 13, 2019, the Titans waived Towbridge.

Buffalo Bills (second stint)
On June 14, 2019, Towbridge was claimed off waivers by the Buffalo Bills. He was waived on August 31, 2019.

Washington Redskins
On November 12, 2019, Towbridge was signed to the Washington Redskins practice squad. His practice squad contract with the team expired on January 6, 2020.

Towbridge was drafted by the New York Guardians in the 2020 XFL Draft.

References

1995 births
Living people
American football tight ends
Atlanta Legends players
Buffalo Bills players
Louisville Cardinals football players
Players of American football from Ohio
Sportspeople from Toledo, Ohio
Tennessee Titans players
Washington Redskins players